Reidar Raaen (15 April 1897 – 5 April 1964) was a Norwegian cyclist. He won the Norwegian National Time Trial Championships in 1924. He also competed in the individual road race at the 1928 Summer Olympics.

References

External links
 

1897 births
1964 deaths
Norwegian male cyclists
Olympic cyclists of Norway
Cyclists at the 1928 Summer Olympics
Sportspeople from Trondheim